"Love Is a Many-Splendored Thing" is a popular song with music by Sammy Fain and lyrics by Paul Francis Webster. 
The song appeared first in the movie Love Is a Many-Splendored Thing (1955), and it won the Academy Award for Best Original Song in 1956. From 1967 to 1973, it was also used as the theme song to Love is a Many Splendored Thing, the soap opera based on the movie. 

Many versions of the song have been released. The best-selling version was recorded by The Four Aces, whose recording reached number two in the UK Singles Chart, and number one on both the Billboard and Cash Box charts in 1955.

Background
The music was commissioned for the movie Love Is a Many-Splendored Thing and included in the film's Oscar-winning score, composed and conducted by Alfred Newman. It was initially only composed as background music for the film, lyrics were subsequently added to make it eligible for the Best Original Song category of the Academy Awards. The original lyrics were rejected by the studio so new ones were written.

The song has been noted for its similarity to the aria "Un bel dì vedremo" from Giacomo Puccini’s opera, Madama Butterfly in its downward moving thirds.

An orchestral version of "Love Is a Many-Splendored Thing" is played at the title sequence of the film, with a vocal version performed by a chorus at the end. Don Cornell and The Four Aces quickly recorded the song before the film was released. Before the Four Aces had a hit with their version, several artists, including Doris Day, disliked the song.

Sammy Fain and Paul Francis Webster won an Oscar for Best Original Song at the 28th Academy Awards, their second Oscar after winning the award for "Secret Love" in 1953. The background score for the film that was built around the melody of the song also won an Oscar for Best Original Score for Alfred Newman.

This song is noted for its memorable lines: "In the morning mist, two lovers kissed, and the world stood still".

Four Aces version

The song was covered by The Four Aces featuring Al Roberts backed by the Jack Pleis Orchestra and issued by Decca Records as catalog number 29625. It was released backed with Shine On, Harvest Moon in July 1955, and reached No. 1 on Billboards first ever Top 100 chart in November 1955. It was ranked No. 8 on Billboards 1955's Top Tune. 

The recording by The Four Aces is featured in the film Cookie (1989). It became a gold record.

Charts

Other versions
Don Cornell recorded a version around at the same time as the Four Aces. It was issued by Coral Records (catalog number 61467) backed with "The Bible Tells Me So". The song reached No. 26 on Billboard Top 100 chart. A number of orchestral versions were also released in the same year and reached the Top 100 chart; David Rose and His Orchestra reached No 54, while Woody Herman and His Orchestra reached No. 79.

Bing Crosby recorded the song in 1955 for use on his radio show and it was subsequently included in the box set The Bing Crosby CBS Radio Recordings (1954-56) issued by Mosaic Records (catalog MD7-245) in 2009.  The song has also been recorded by Ringo Starr (on his album Sentimental Journey), Frank Sinatra, Andy Williams, Shirley Bassey, Nat King Cole and Barry Manilow. Neil Sedaka recorded the song in Italian as "L'Amore E' Una Cosa Meravigliosa". 

Connie Francis recorded the song in Italian in 1960 during the work for her album More Italian Favorites, although this version remains unreleased to this day. Francis also recorded the original English lyrics in 1961 for her album Connie Francis Sings 'Never on Sunday' and Other Title Songs from Motion Pictures. The instrumental playback of this 1961 recording was also used when Francis cut a German-language version, "Sag, weißt du denn, was Liebe ist", in 1966.

The song was also performed by Fairuz in Arabian language ("Zar Bisukun Al Lail"). French-Malaysian singer Shake recorded a French version of the song in 1977 titled "Rien n'est plus beau que l'amour".  A Disco version was recorded by Tina Charles in 1980. Jeff Lynne recorded his version for his nostalgic cover album Long Wave in 2012.

Barry Manilow recorded a version which reached No. 32 on the Adult Contemporary chart in 2006.

This song has been a staple of Engelbert Humperdinck's live show since 1995.

In popular culture
This song can be heard in the movies Grease, Circle of Friends, Private Parts, St. Trinian's, St. Trinian's 2: The Legend of Fritton's Gold, and The Nutty Professor 2.  The song, among others, was referenced in Moulin Rouge! when Christian says, "Love is like oxygen - love is a many splendored thing - love lifts us up where we belong! All you need is love!."

It has been also heard in the series Bones, in the 14th episode of the third season sung by Dr. Zack Addy (Eric Millegan).

See also
List of number-one singles of 1955 (U.S.)

References

1955 singles
Songs with lyrics by Paul Francis Webster
Songs with music by Sammy Fain
The Four Aces songs
Nat King Cole songs
Andy Williams songs
Barry Manilow songs
Number-one singles in the United States
Best Original Song Academy Award-winning songs
1955 songs
Decca Records singles
Love themes
Songs written for films
1950s ballads